Suntar (Suntaar) is a rural locality (a selo) and the administrative center of Suntarsky District in the Sakha Republic, Russia, located on the Vilyuy River. Population:

Transportation
It is served by the Suntar Airport.

Climate
Suntar has a subarctic climate (Köppen climate classification Dfc), with short, warm summers and long, bitterly cold winters. Precipitation is low but is significantly higher in summer than at other times of the year.

References

Rural localities in Suntarsky District